Sheffield is the primary village and a census-designated place (CDP) in the town of Sheffield, Caledonia County, Vermont, United States. It was first listed as a CDP prior to the 2020 census.

The village is in northern Caledonia County, along the southern edge of the town of Sheffield. It is bordered to the south by the town of Wheelock. The village sits in the valley of Miller Run, a southeast-flowing tributary of the Passumpsic River and part of the Connecticut River watershed.

Vermont Route 122 runs through the center of the village, leading northwest  to Barton and southeast  to Lyndonville. Interstate 91 runs along the northeast edge of the CDP, but with no direct access, the closest interchange being Exit 24 (VT 122) in Lyndon Center,  to the southeast.

References 

Populated places in Caledonia County, Vermont
Census-designated places in Caledonia County, Vermont
Census-designated places in Vermont